Glochidion comitum is a species of plant in the family Phyllanthaceae. It is endemic to Pitcairn.  It is threatened by habitat loss.

References

Flora of the Pitcairn Islands
comitum
Endangered plants
Taxonomy articles created by Polbot